Gonatopus jacki is a species of small wasp in the family Dryinidae. It is found in United States.

Etymology
The species was named after the collector of the specimen, John T. (Jack) Longino.

Description
The species is similar to G. ashmeadi and G. agropyrus. Male is unknown. Female has brown head, antennae and legs. Mesosoma and metasoma black.

References

Dryinidae
Insects described in 2018